"Come Monday"  is a song written and recorded by American singer-songwriter Jimmy Buffett. It was first released on his 1974 album Living & Dying in ¾ Time.

Content
Buffett wrote the song to his wife while he was on tour. At a live performance in 1974, Buffett mentioned that he had written the song heading out to California the previous year, meaning that it would have been written as he was "heading up to San Francisco for the Labor Day Weekend show" in 1973. The single version replaces the third line, "I've got my Hush Puppies on," with "I've got my hiking shoes on."

It is one of Buffett's more popular songs, and is part of "The Big 8" that he has played at almost all of his concerts, typically changing the line "I just can't wait to see you again" to "It's so nice to be in...(location of show)...again".

Chart performance
"Come Monday" was Buffett's first Top 40 hit single, reaching  30 on the Billboard Hot 100 as well as  3 Easy Listening and  58 Country.

References

1974 singles
Jimmy Buffett songs
Songs written by Jimmy Buffett
1974 songs
Dunhill Records singles